The 1996 Tampa Bay Buccaneers season was the team's 21st in the National Football League (NFL).  The Buccaneers failed to improve on their 7–9 season in 1995, finishing 6–10. It was the first season under head coach Tony Dungy. The 1996 season marked the final year that the Buccaneers wore their trademark orange, red, and white uniforms. Until 2010, it was the last time that the Buccaneers failed to sell out any of its home games. Despite Tampa finishing with a losing record, Dungy had restored the competitive spirit in the organization. Five of the 10 losses was only by a touchdown or less.

Offseason
Prior to the season the Buccaneers were still unsure if the team would remain in Tampa Bay or if it would be moved by new ownership family led by Malcolm Glazer and sons, either to Cleveland, Los Angeles, or the nearby city of Orlando. Eventually, the team's future was determined by a local referendum, which approved funding for a new stadium for the  season.

Rule changes earlier in the decade brought about a salary cap, and a minimum spending cap forced Bucs to spend more on players. With the new ownership, tax disclosures showed the old Culverhouse regime was running a "for-profit" business in which players who were getting good were released before their contracts could get big, all the while claiming poor and trying to get some home games played in Orlando.

NFL Draft
Prior to the 1996 season the team drafted fullback Mike Alstott, who became one of the most popular players in the team's history, as well as cornerback Donnie Abraham. Although Alstott would become one of the Buccaneers’ most popular players of all time, the organization did not target him in the draft: the team had originally wanted tailback Leeland McElroy, who would be taken before the Bucs drafted.

Undrafted free agents

Season summary
Despite having been 7–7 toward the end of 1995, the 1996 team went 0–5 before getting their first win over Tony Dungy's former team, the Minnesota Vikings. The 24–13 win over Minnesota started another streak few noted at the time, in which the team held opponents to 13 points or less in four consecutive games. Despite this, the Oakland Raiders came to Tampa Bay in Week Eleven facing a 1–8 Buccaneers team. Tampa Bay defeated Oakland 20–17 in overtime, which was the first of five wins over the next seven games.

The following week, Tampa Bay traveled to the west coast, where they historically had trouble winning. Playing an interconference game at San Diego, Tampa Bay quickly found themselves down 14–0. The morning of the game, Warren Sapp and Derrick Brooks were in their hotel room watching ESPN's Sunday NFL Countdown. Chris Berman referred to the game as the "Superchargers" versus the "Yucs" – a derogatory nickname that had stemmed from the Bucs' many years of futility. Sapp and Brooks finally took exception to the ridicule they were being subjected to. Tampa Bay would rally in the game with a 25–3 run and won by the score of 25–17. Tampa Bay would win two of the next three, including an emotional win over Chicago 34–19 in which the Bucs returned a punt for a touchdown.

Many fans took encouragement from the team going 5–2 in the final seven games, as well as the emergence of defensive tackle Warren Sapp who had nine sacks on the season, linebacker Derrick Brooks, and fullback Mike Alstott, who along with safety John Lynch and linebacker Hardy Nickerson, were forming the core of what would prove to be a dominant defense.

The offense struggled all season, and was not helped by an ill-advised holdout by running back Errict Rhett, who would have far fewer carries the following year.

Personnel

Staff

Roster

Regular season

Schedule

Notes:
Division opponents in bold text

* = blacked out locally

Standings

References

Tampa Bay Buccaneers season
Tampa Bay Buccaneers
20th century in Tampa, Florida
Tampa Bay Buccaneers seasons